The EF40mm f/2.8 STM was a standard prime lens which was introduced by Canon in June 2012, alongside the EOS 650D/Kiss X6i/Rebel T4i. The lens features a maximum aperture of f/2.8. It was Canon's first EF pancake lens. The EF 40mm was the first EF lens equipped with a stepping motor (STM). It was discontinued in March 2021.

See also
Pancake lens

References

External links

 
 EF40mm f/2.8 STM - Canon Camera Museum

Canon EF lenses
Camera lenses introduced in 2012
Pancake lenses